Moussa Ndiaye (born 20 February 1979) is a Senegalese former professional footballer who played as a midfielder.

Club career
Ndiaye was born in Piré. He played for AS Monaco and CS Sedan, both in France. At Monaco he was part of the squad that won Ligue 1 in 2000.

International career
Ndiaye played for Senegal national team and was a participant at the 2002 FIFA World Cup.

Career statistics
Scores and results list Senegal's goal tally first, score column indicates score after each N'Diaye goal.

Honours 
Monaco
Ligue 1: 1999–2000

References

1979 births
Living people
Senegalese footballers
Association football midfielders
Senegal international footballers
Ligue 1 players
Ligue 2 players
Qatar Stars League players
AS Monaco FC players
CS Sedan Ardennes players
FC Istres players
AC Ajaccio players
AJ Auxerre players
Al-Rayyan SC players
Umm Salal SC players
ASC Jaraaf players
AS Douanes (Senegal) players
ASC Niarry Tally players
US Gorée players
2002 FIFA World Cup players
2000 African Cup of Nations players
2002 African Cup of Nations players
Senegalese expatriate footballers
Senegalese expatriate sportspeople in France
Expatriate footballers in France
Senegalese expatriate sportspeople in Qatar
Expatriate footballers in Qatar